Trochastica is a genus of moths of the family Yponomeutidae.

Species
Trochastica albifrenis - Meyrick, 1913 

Yponomeutidae